Benecke may refer to:

Berthold Benecke (1843–1886), German anatomist and embryologist
Christina Benecke (born 1974), volleyball player from Germany
Emil Benecke (1898–1945), German water polo player who competed in the 1928 Summer Olympics and in the 1932 Summer Olympics
Georg Friedrich Benecke (1762–1844), German philologist
Joanna Benecke, British-Swedish screenwriter and actress
Louis Benecke (1843–1919), American businessman, lawyer, and politician
Lydia Benecke (born 1982), German criminal psychologist and writer of popular science non-fiction
Mark Benecke (born 1970), German forensic biologist
Paul Beneke (early 1400s (decade) – c. 1480), German town councillor of Danzig and a privateer
Robert Benecke (1835–1903), German-born American photographer, operating primarily out of St. Louis
Wilhelm Christian Benecke von Gröditzberg (1779–1860), German banker, merchant, estate owner and art collector

See also
Benecke-Kaliko, based in Hanover, developer and manufacturer of surface materials made of plastics
Beneck
Beneke
Behncke
Brennecke

German-language surnames
Surnames from given names